Good Together is a 1989 album by English post-punk band A Certain Ratio (ACR). Though the band had signed to A&M Records in 1987, they lost the attention of the public as it was not until the summer of 1989 that new album arrived. When it did, the hoped for more accessible sound of the singles "The Big E" and "Backs To The Wall" failed to secure hits. A third single "Your Blue Eyes" appeared on an EP in 1990. Their next album, acr:mcr, followed on A&M the next year. Due to the lack of success of both albums, the band left A&M shortly after.

Track listing

References

1989 albums
A Certain Ratio albums